Ovidiu Marc (born 9 April 1968) is a Romanian former footballer who played as a defender. After he ended his playing career, he worked as a manager. His son, Andrei Marc was also a footballer who played at Ceahlăul Piatra Neamț.

Honours
Ceahlăul Piatra Neamț
Divizia B: 1992–93

Notes

References

1968 births
Living people
Romanian footballers
Association football defenders
Liga I players
Liga II players
CSM Ceahlăul Piatra Neamț players
Romanian football managers
CSM Ceahlăul Piatra Neamț managers
People from Neamț County